The National Union of Boot and Shoe Operatives (NUBSO) was a trade union in the United Kingdom which existed between 1873 and 1971. It represented workers in the footwear industry.

History
The union was founded in 1873, when many riveters and finishers left the Amalgamated Society of Boot and Shoe Makers.  They were dissatisfied by their low status within the old union, and instead formed the National Union of Boot and Shoe Rivetters and Finishers (NUBSRF).  Membership in Leicester grew rapidly, with the next largest branches being Glasgow, London and Stafford.  In total, by 1877, the union had about 4,000 members.

A few women joined the union in the late 1880s, making it the first union outside the textile trades to admit both men and women.  At this point, membership in the important shoe making centre of Northampton was low, with only about 600 of 15,000 shoe workers in the town holding union membership.  That year, a five-week lock-out of members resulted in a settlement favourable to the union.  This brought in hundreds of new members, and by the end of the year, its national membership reached 10,000.  The General Union of Clickers and Rough-stuff Cutters merged into the NUBSRF in 1892, but most of its members left again in 1895.

During the late 1880s and early 1890s, socialists came to prominence in the union.  They led campaigns against sweatshop working and outworking, where people worked from their own homes and were paid by item completed.  Under their influence, the union organised a 34-week strike in 1897, in support of a minimum wage and a 54-hour week, but this was unsuccessful.

In 1897, the union renamed itself as the "National Union of Boot and Shoe Operatives", and joined the General Federation of Trade Unions the following year.  Membership rose over 100,000 by 1920, although it soon fell to around 80,000.  Members in the Republic of Ireland left in 1953, to form the Irish Shoe and Leather Workers' Union.

A major decline in the British shoe-making industry led the union to merge with the Amalgamated Society of Leather Workers, the National Union of Glovers and Leather Workers and the National Union of Leather Workers and Allied Trades in 1971, forming National Union of Footwear, Leather and Allied Trades.

Election results
The union was affiliated to the Labour Party, and sponsored numerous Parliamentary candidates, many of whom won election.

Leadership

General Secretaries
1874: Thomas Smith
1878: George Sedgwick
1886: William Inskip
1899: W. Boyd Hornidge
1908: Edward L. Poulton
1930: George Chester
1949: Lionel Poole
1960: Richard Gregson
1968: T. A. Moore

General Presidents
1878: Edward Kell
1890: T. Horrabin
1892: Jabez Leedham
1892: John Judge
1893: W. Boyd Hornidge
1899: Charles Freak
1910: Thomas Frederick Richards
1930: W. R. Townley
1938: Len Smith
1944: James Crawford
1957: Sydney Robinson

References

External links
Catalogue of the NUBSO archives, held at the Modern Records Centre, University of Warwick

 
Defunct trade unions of the United Kingdom
Footwear industry trade unions
1873 establishments in the United Kingdom
Trade unions established in 1873
Trade unions disestablished in 1971
Trade unions based in Northamptonshire